Mountainville is an unincorporated community located within Tewksbury Township in Hunterdon County, New Jersey. The Mountainville Historic District was listed on the National Register of Historic Places in 1993.

Historic district

The Mountainville Historic District is a historic district encompassing the village. It was added to the National Register of Historic Places on December 7, 1993 for its significance in architecture, commerce, community development, and industry. It includes 64 contributing buildings. Farley's General Store was built  with Italianate style.

References

External links
 
 

Tewksbury Township, New Jersey
Unincorporated communities in Hunterdon County, New Jersey
Unincorporated communities in New Jersey
National Register of Historic Places in Hunterdon County, New Jersey
Historic districts on the National Register of Historic Places in New Jersey
New Jersey Register of Historic Places